Charles William Hinks (28 April 1880 – 1956) was an English footballer who played in the Football League for Stockport County and Stoke.

Career
Hinks started his football career with Darwen and then joined Stockport County where he managed one appearance in the Football League. He joined Manchester City in 1902 and failed to get a game and joined Stoke where again he managed just a single appearance.

Personal life 
Hinks served in the Royal Naval Air Service and the Royal Navy during the First World War. He finished the war as a corporal clerk in the Royal Air Force.

Career statistics

References

English footballers
Manchester City F.C. players
Stoke City F.C. players
Stockport County F.C. players
English Football League players
1880 births
1956 deaths
Darwen F.C. players
Altrincham F.C. players
Association football inside forwards
Association football outside forwards
Eccles United F.C. players
Haslingden F.C. players
Hyde United F.C. players
Southport F.C. players
Royal Naval Air Service personnel of World War I
Royal Air Force personnel of World War I